Darryl M. Bell (sometimes credited as Daryl Bell; born May 10, 1963) is an American actor best known for his role as Big Brother X-Ray Vision in the 1988 Spike Lee film School Daze and as Ron Johnson Jr. on the NBC sitcom A Different World (1987–93). Darryl Bell also starred on the short-lived UPN sitcom Homeboys in Outer Space as Morris Clay.

Bell was born as the son of Travers J. Bell Jr., the founder of the first black firm on the New York Stock Exchange. 
Bell graduated from Delbarton School in Morristown, New Jersey in May 1981, where he was one of four African American students, accounting for 1% of the school's enrollment.
Bell also attended Syracuse University. Bell is a member of Alpha Phi Alpha, having pledged the fraternity through the Delta Zeta chapter in Spring 1982. He is in a 30 year-long committed relationship with actress Tempestt Bledsoe, who co-starred in the NBC TV comedy The Cosby Show. The couple appeared together in the Fox reality TV series Househusbands of Hollywood, that debuted in August 2009.

Television

References

External links

American male film actors
American male television actors
Male actors from Chicago
African-American male actors
Delbarton School alumni
1963 births
Living people
Syracuse University alumni
21st-century African-American people
20th-century African-American people